The six teams in this group played against each other on a home-and-away basis. The group winner Denmark qualified for the 17th FIFA World Cup held in South Korea and Japan. The runner-up Czech Republic advanced to the UEFA Play-off and played against Belgium. Denmark went through the group undefeated, but four draws - three in their first five matches - kept the Czech Republic in the hunt despite the latter shipping an unexpected loss to Iceland, which in turn kept Bulgaria in with a shout for second place. In fact, in the final round of matches, the Czechs were level with Bulgaria on points but delivered a 6-0 hammering: while Denmark, just two points ahead of the Czechs, thrashed Iceland by the same margin to maintain their lead in the group.

Standings

Results

Goalscorers

9 goals

 Ebbe Sand

5 goals

 Dimitar Berbatov
 Pavel Nedvěd

4 goals

 Jon Dahl Tomasson
 David Healy

3 goals

 Georgi Ivanov
 Milan Baroš
 Dennis Rommedahl
 Eyjólfur Sverrisson

2 goals

 Krasimir Chomakov
 Martin Petrov
 Jan Koller
 Pavel Kuka
 Marek Jankulovski
 Vratislav Lokvenc
 Tomáš Rosický
 Thomas Gravesen
 Ríkharður Daðason
 Þórður Guðjónsson
 Eiður Guðjohnsen
 Tryggvi Guðmundsson
 Philip Mulryne

1 goal

 Krasimir Balakov
 Svetoslav Todorov
 Karel Poborský
 Roman Týce
 Morten Bisgaard
 Jan Heintze
 Claus Jensen
 Jan Michaelsen
 Hermann Hreidarsson
 Helgi Sigurðsson
 Andri Sigþórsson
 Gilbert Agius
 David Carabott
 George Mallia
 Michael Mifsud
 Stuart Elliott
 Phil Gray
 Michael Hughes
 George McCartney
 Mark Williams

References

External links
FIFA official page
RSSSF - 2002 World Cup Qualification
Allworldcup

3
2000–01 in Bulgarian football
2001–02 in Bulgarian football
2000–01 in Northern Ireland association football
2001–02 in Northern Ireland association football
2000–01 in Czech football
2001–02 in Czech football
2000–01 in Maltese football
2001–02 in Maltese football
2000–01 in Danish football
Qual